Melissa Jane Ruscoe  (born 15 December 1976) is a New Zealand sportswoman who has served as captain of her country's national team in two different football codes: association football and rugby union.

Football career

Ruscoe made her Football Ferns debut in a 0–1 loss to Bulgaria on 24 August 1994. She finished her international career with 23 caps and 2 goals to her credit.

Rugby career

After leaving behind her international career in soccer, Ruscoe switched to rugby, joining the Canterbury team in New Zealand's women's provincial championship in 2003. As a loose forward, she made the Black Ferns the following year. She has played on Black Ferns teams that won the Churchill Cup in 2004 and the Women's Rugby World Cup in 2006, and was also named the New Zealand women's player of the year in 2005. Ruscoe captained the Black Ferns to victory in the 2010 Women's Rugby World Cup.

In the 2011 New Year Honours, Ruscoe was appointed a Member of the New Zealand Order of Merit for services to women's rugby. She has been the assistant coach of Canterbury in the Farah Palmer Cup since 2016. She currently teaches at Hillmorton High School.

References

External links
Black Ferns Profile

1976 births
Living people
Footballers who switched code
Members of the New Zealand Order of Merit
New Zealand women's association footballers
New Zealand women's international footballers
New Zealand women's international rugby union players
New Zealand female rugby union players
Rugby union flankers
Women's association footballers not categorized by position